Paenibacillus macerans is a diazotroph bacterium found in soil and plants capable of nitrogen fixation and fermentation. This bacteria was originally 
discovered in 1905 by an Austrian biologist named Schardinger and thought to be a bacillus.

Characteristics
Paenibacillus macerans is a part of the family Paenibacillaceae which are facultative anaerobes. It is gram-variable, being gram-positive
or gram-negative rods.
Does not have a capsule and has peritrichous flagella for movement. It does form ellipsoidal, terminal, or subterminal spores
which may last in the soil for many years.

Growth conditions
P. macerans can be grown in the lab on a nutrient agar with a slightly acidic pH around 5. Optimal growth temperature is 30 °C. No  growth in 5% NaCl.

Metabolic capabilities
P. macerans has been shown to have some of the broadest metabolic capabilities of any of the genus Paenibacillus. It is able to ferment hexoses, deoxyhexoses, 
pentoses, cellulose, hemicellulose and glycerol under anaerobic conditions. 
The high fermentation rates of glycerol makes this an important organism in the study of fuel and chemical production. P. Macerans also produces a significant amount of histamines which may cause allergies in some individuals if ingested. This bacterium is a facultative anaerobe capable of nitrogen fixation so in the absence of oxygen it is able to convert nitrogen gas to ammonia which is more easily used by plants.

Ecology
P. macerans is usually found in soil and plant materials but has also been identified in blood cultures of infants with infection. The bacterium is not normally pathogenic in humans but could cause allergies as a result of its histamine producing properties.

References

External links
Type strain of Paenibacillus macerans at BacDive -  the Bacterial Diversity Metadatabase

Paenibacillaceae
Bacteria described in 1905